There are several equivalent ways for defining trigonometric functions, and the proof of the trigonometric identities between them depend on the chosen definition. The oldest and somehow the most elementary definition is based on the geometry of right triangles. The proofs given in this article use this definition, and thus apply to non-negative angles not greater than a right angle. For greater and negative angles, see Trigonometric functions.

Other definitions, and therefore other proofs are based on the Taylor series of sine and cosine, or on the differential equation  to which they are solutions.

Elementary trigonometric identities

Definitions

The six trigonometric functions are defined for every real number, except, for some of them, for angles that differ from 0 by a multiple of the right angle (90°). Referring to the diagram at the right, the six trigonometric functions of θ are, for angles smaller than the right angle:

Ratio identities

In the case of angles smaller than a right angle, the following identities are direct consequences of above definitions through the division identity
 
They remain valid for angles greater than 90° and for negative angles.

Or

Complementary angle identities
Two angles whose sum is π/2 radians (90 degrees) are complementary.  In the diagram, the angles at vertices A and B are complementary, so we can exchange a and b, and change θ to π/2 − θ, obtaining:

Pythagorean identities

Identity 1:

The following two results follow from this and the ratio identities.

Similarly

Identity 2:

The following accounts for all three reciprocal functions.

Proof 2:

Refer to the triangle diagram above. Note that  by Pythagorean theorem.

Substituting with appropriate functions -

Rearranging gives:

Angle sum identities

Sine

Let PQ be a line perpendicular to line OQ defined by angle , drawn from point Q on this line to point P.  OQP is a right angle.

Let QA be a perpendicular from point A on the x-axis to Q and PB be a perpendicular from point B on the x-axis to P.  OAQ and OBP are right angles.

Draw R on PB so that QR is parallel to the x-axis.

Now angle  (because ,
making , and finally )

, so 
, so 

Cosine
Using the figure above,

, so 

, so 

Also, using the complementary angle formulae,

Tangent and cotangent
From the sine and cosine formulae, we get

Similarly from the sine and cosine formulae, we get

Or, using ,

Using ,

Double-angle identities
From the angle sum identities, we get

and

The Pythagorean identities give the two alternative forms for the latter of these:

The angle sum identities also give

It can also be proved using Euler's formula

Squaring both sides yields

But replacing the angle with its doubled version, which achieves the same result in the left side of the equation, yields

It follows that

.

Expanding the square and simplifying on the left hand side of the equation gives

.

Because the imaginary and real parts have to be the same, we are left with the original identities

,

and also

.

Half-angle identities
The two identities giving the alternative forms for cos 2θ lead to the following equations:

The sign of the square root needs to be chosen properly—note that if 2 is added to θ, the quantities inside the square roots are unchanged, but the left-hand-sides of the equations change sign.  Therefore, the correct sign to use depends on the value of θ.

For the tan function, the equation is:

Then multiplying the numerator and denominator inside the square root by (1 + cos θ) and using Pythagorean identities leads to:

Also, if the numerator and denominator are both multiplied by (1 - cos θ), the result is:

This also gives:

Similar manipulations for the cot function give:

Miscellaneous – the triple tangent identity

Proof:

Miscellaneous – the triple cotangent identity

If  quarter circle,
.

Proof:

Given

so the result follows from the triple tangent identity.

Sum to product identities

Proof of sine identities

First, start with the sum-angle identities:

By adding these together,

Similarly, by subtracting the two sum-angle identities,

 and 

Substitute  and 

Therefore,

Proof of cosine identities

Similarly for cosine, start with the sum-angle identities:

Again, by adding and subtracting

Inequalities

The figure at the right shows a sector of a circle with radius 1. We assume here that .

Since triangle  lies completely inside the sector, which in turn lies completely inside triangle , we have

This geometric argument relies on definitions of arc length and
area, which act as assumptions, so it is rather a condition imposed in construction of trigonometric functions than
a provable property. For the sine function, we can handle other values.  If , then .  But  (because of the Pythagorean identity), so .  So we have

For negative values of  we have, by the symmetry of the sine function

Hence

and

Identities involving calculus

Preliminaries

Sine and angle ratio identity

In other words, the function sine is differentiable at 0, and its derivative is 1.

Proof: From the previous inequalities, we have, for small angles

,
Therefore,
,
Consider the right-hand inequality. Since

Multiply through by 

Combining with the left-hand inequality:

Taking  to the limit as 

Therefore,

Cosine and angle ratio identity

Proof:

The limits of those three quantities are 1, 0, and 1/2, so the resultant limit is zero.

Cosine and square of angle ratio identity

Proof:

As in the preceding proof,

The limits of those three quantities are 1, 1, and 1/2, so the resultant limit is 1/2.

Proof of compositions of trig and inverse trig functions

All these functions follow from the Pythagorean trigonometric identity. We can prove for instance the function

Proof:

We start from
 (I)
Then we divide this equation (I) by 

 (II)

Then use the substitution :

Then we use the identity 
 (III)

And initial Pythagorean trigonometric identity proofed...

Similarly if we divide this equation (I) by 
 (II)

Then use the substitution :

Then we use the identity 
 (III)

And initial Pythagorean trigonometric identity proofed...

 (IV)

Let we guess that we have to prove:

 (V)

Replacing (V) into (IV) :

So it's true:  and guessing statement was true: 

Now y can be written as x ; and we have [arcsin] expressed through [arctan]...

Similarly if we seek :...

From :...

And finally we have [arccos] expressed through [arctan]...

See also

 List of trigonometric identities
 Bhaskara I's sine approximation formula
 Generating trigonometric tables
 Aryabhata's sine table
 Madhava's sine table
 Table of Newtonian series
 Madhava series
 Unit vector (explains direction cosines)
 Euler's formula

Notes

References

 E. T. Whittaker and G. N. Watson. A Course of Modern Analysis, Cambridge University Press, 1952

Trigonometry
Article proofs